The Tasmanian clingfish (Aspasmogaster tasmaniensis) is a clingfish of the family Gobiesocidae, found around the western and southern coasts of Australia including Tasmania.  Its length is up to 8 cm. This species is found in shallow, coastal, rocky reefs and in the intertidal zone. It is also encountered by scuba divers beneath piers and jetties.

References

Tasmanian clingfish
Marine fish of Tasmania
Endemic fauna of Tasmania
Tasmanian clingfish
Tasmanian clingfish